Clara D'Ovar (1925–2002) was a Portuguese singer and film actress. She starred in several French and Portuguese films during the 1960s. She was born on 4 November 1925 in Ovar, Portugal. She passed 30 June 2002 in Ovar, Portugal.

Selected filmography
 Portuguese Vacation (1963)
 Thank You, Natercia (1963)
 The Crime of Aldeia Velha (1964)
 Not Three (1964)

References
Paulo Fernando, locutor,realizador,jornalista.

Bibliography
 Jean-Pierre Berthomé & Gaël Naizet. Bretagne et cinéma: cent ans de création cinématographique en Bretagne. Cinémathèque de Bretagne, 1995.

External links

1925 births
2002 deaths
Portuguese film actresses
20th-century Portuguese women singers
20th-century Portuguese actresses